Kahin Deep Jale Kahin Dil is an Indian song from the Bollywood film Bees Saal Baad (1962). The lyrics of the song were written by Shakeel Badayuni, the music was composed by Hemanta Mukherjee and Lata Mangeshkar was the playback singer. In 1963, Badayuni received the Filmfare Award for Best Lyricist and Lata Mangeshkar received the Filmfare Award for Best Female Playback Singer for this song. This was Mangeshkar's second Filmfare award.

Awards 
Bees Saal Baad was a horror film. The Filmfare critics noted: "Appropriate background music and hauntingly melodious songs, particularly, "kahin deep jale" number, further enhance the appeal of Bees Saal Baad.

References

External links 
 

Hindi-language songs
1962 songs
Indian songs
Lata Mangeshkar songs